Chris Soto is an American politician and former member of the Connecticut House of Representatives, serving from 2017 to 2019. He was first elected to the legislature in 2016, representing the 39th district of New London. Chris Soto currently serves as a Senior Advisor to U.S. Secretary of Education, Miguel Cardona.

Early life and education
Soto was born in Manhattan, New York City and raised in West New York, New Jersey. After graduating from High School, he received an appointment to attend the U.S. Coast Guard Academy, He graduated and earned a Bachelor of Science degree in Operations Research. Soto also earned his Master's in Public Affairs (MPA) from Brown University.

Military service
Following graduation from the Coast Guard Academy, Soto served as an Engineer Officer in Training on the USCGC Valiant (WMEC-621). Immediately following, he received orders to Maritime Safety and Security Team New York. He left active duty service in 2008 and continued in the active reserve until 2013. He separated from the reserves at the rank of Lieutenant Commander.

Political career
Soto was elected to the Connecticut House of Representatives in 2016. He defeated long-time incumbent Ernest Hewett by a near 2-to-1 ratio. He went on to win the general election with 83% of the vote. Soto went unchallenged in the 2018 general election. Soto served in the state house for two years from 2017–2019. During his time in the house, Soto served as vice-chairman of the Appropriations Committee and member of the Housing, and Higher Education & Employment Advancement committees.

While serving in the state House, Soto worked successfully to expand in-state tuition aid to undocumented students, helped draft and pass legislation to regulate Sober Homes, and successfully championed the renovation New London's Bartlett Park. Soto also worked with Southeastern Connecticut legislators and the Governor's Office to successfully fund infrastructure improvements at New London's State Pier and is also credited for proactively helping to increase Latino voter turnout in the city of New London.

Soto left his role in the Connecticut House to join Governor Ned Lamont's administration as Director of Legislative Affairs in 2019. In early 2020, Soto joined the Connecticut's State Department of Education as Director of Innovation and Partnerships to then Connecticut State Education Commissioner Miguel Cardona. In December 2021, President Biden announced the nomination of Miguel Cardona as U.S. Secretary of Education.  Soon after, Soto joined the U.S. Department of Education as a Senior Advisor to Secretary of Education Miguel Cardona.

Coast Guard Academy criticism
Soto has been vocal about the lack of accountability at the Coast Guard Academy with respect to issues of racism and discrimination. He was the first to call for an investigation by federal officials after cadets complained of systemic discrimination at the institution. He previously criticized the institution on the lack of recruiting diversity in their incoming classes.

Other work
Soto is the founder and first executive director of Higher Edge, a college completion organization in Eastern Connecticut that supports high school students getting to and through college.

References 

21st-century American politicians
Connecticut Democrats
Living people
United States Coast Guard Academy alumni
Brown University alumni
Year of birth missing (living people)